Orthogonius hypocritoides is a species of ground beetle in the subfamily Orthogoniinae. It was described by Jedlicka in 1935.

References

hypocritoides
Beetles described in 1935